Eric Bertram Crockford (13 October 1888 – 17 January 1958) was a British field hockey player who competed in the 1920 Summer Olympics. He was a member of the British field hockey team, which won the gold medal. He also played first-class cricket for Warwickshire in 21 matches between 1911 and 1922.

References

External links
 
Profile

1888 births
1958 deaths
People educated at Eastbourne College
British male field hockey players
Olympic field hockey players of Great Britain
Field hockey players at the 1920 Summer Olympics
Olympic gold medallists for Great Britain
English Olympic medallists
English cricketers
Warwickshire cricketers
English solicitors
Olympic medalists in field hockey
Medalists at the 1920 Summer Olympics
20th-century English lawyers